Suzanne Farrell (born August 16, 1945) is an American ballerina and the founder of the Suzanne Farrell Ballet at the Kennedy Center in Washington, D.C.

Farrell began her ballet training at the age of eight. In 1960, she received a scholarship to the School of American Ballet. Her first leading roles in ballets came in the early 1960s. A muse of George Balanchine, she left the New York City Ballet in 1969 and subsequently moved to Brussels to dance for Maurice Bejart's Ballet of the 20th Century.

In 1975, Farrell moved back to the United States, where she collaborated with Balanchine until his death in 1983; she retired from ballet six years later after a hip surgery she had due to arthritis. Farrell had an unusually long career as a ballet performer, and since her retirement in 1989 has acted as a teacher in numerous ballet schools. She held a teaching position with the New York City Ballet until 1993, and has been a professor of dance at Florida State University since 2000; the same year, she founded her own company, the Suzanne Farrell Ballet, which disbanded at the end of 2017.

The recipient of several honorary degrees, Farrell remains well-known and respected in the world of ballet and has been recognized for her influence on dance with several awards and honors, including Kennedy Center Honors and the Presidential Medal of Freedom, the latter being the highest civilian honor in the United States. She was presented in 1987 with the Golden Plate Award of the American Academy of Achievement at a ceremony in Scottsdale, Arizona. She was also elected to the American Philosophical Society in 2016.

Early life

Farrell was born Roberta Sue Ficker in Cincinnati, Ohio. She received her early training at the Cincinnati Conservatory of Music. In 1960 she was selected to study at George Balanchine's School of American Ballet with a Ford Foundation scholarship. In 1961, she joined the New York City Ballet (NYCB) and became Balanchine's muse for many of his ballets.

Career

Early career at NYCB
Initially part of the corps de ballet at NYCB, Farrell soon moved on to dancing featured roles. The first ballet choreographed for her was Passage, now Arcade, by John Taras in 1963. Balanchine first paired her with Jacques d'Amboise to choreograph his Meditation, which debuted in December 1963. One of her most notable roles was Dulcinea in Balanchine's Don Quixote, which premiered in May 1965; Balanchine's creation of that ballet was thought to be a valentine to his newest "muse", and Balanchine performed in the role of Don Quixote on opening night. In 1968, he cast her as the lead in the "Diamonds" section of his three-act plotless ballet Jewels.

She re-scaled many ballets and expanded them to a new level of technique. In 1965, she was promoted to principal dancer. Her first role in her new title was Agon with Arthur Mitchell at the Paris Opera. George Balanchine quickly fell in love with his "alabaster princess" and created many roles for her. Farrell described learning choreography from Balanchine as a collaborative process, saying, "When Mr. B was working on a ballet, something would just spill out of his body; he could rarely duplicate it, so I tried to see precisely what he wanted the first time."

Balanchine was married to the polio-stricken former ballerina Tanaquil Le Clercq, however, and Farrell was a Catholic. Though Balanchine divorced LeClercq to pursue Farrell, she instead married fellow dancer Paul Mejia. This caused the relationship of Farrell and Balanchine to fracture. There was enormous tension between them, which caused Farrell and husband Mejia to leave the company. Mejia and Farrell were married from 1969 to 1997.

She and her husband later joined the European company Ballet of the 20th Century of the French choreographer Maurice Béjart, based in Brussels. With this company she danced leading roles, some created for her, for four years, exploring a style of choreography completely different from Balanchine's. She eventually returned to Balanchine and the New York City Ballet in 1975. Balanchine continued to create new ballets for her, such as Chaconne, Mozartiana, Tzigane and Robert Schumann's Davidsbündlertänze.

Farrell also found herself often paired with the Dane Peter Martins. Her partnership with Balanchine lasted until his death in April 1983; his last works were solos for Farrell. Farrell retired from the New York City Ballet at age 44 on November 26, 1989, after being fired by Martins due to her three year long absence from the stage, which was caused by her arthritis. She performed Sophisticated Lady and Vienna Waltzes. Farrell gave her final bow at State Theater with New York City Ballet co-founder Lincoln Kirstein by her side.

Career as a dance teacher
Twenty-eight years of an occupation which takes a tremendous physical toll on the body began to come to an end in 1983. She started to develop arthritis in her right hip and despite two years of varied treatments, by 1985 (at the age of 40), her career on stage was almost over. She struggled for several years but ultimately retired from performing in 1989.

She then moved on to passing on the ballets of Balanchine to the next generation of ballet dancers, working with companies around the world, such as those in Berlin and Vienna, as well as the Paris Opera Ballet, Kirov Ballet and the Bolshoi Ballet. In 1993, the New York City Ballet dismissed her from her teaching position with the company. 

In 2000, Farrell began teaching in the Dance Department at Florida State University (Tallahassee, Florida).

Career at the Kennedy Center
In 2000, Farrell started her own company, the Suzanne Farrell Ballet, now a full-fledged company produced by the Kennedy Center.

Farrell's engagement with the Kennedy Center began in 1993 and 1994, when the Center offered two series of ballet master classes for students with Farrell. This series provided intermediate-to-advanced level ballet students, ages 13 to 17, an opportunity to study with one of the greatest ballerinas of the 20th century. Due to the uniqueness of Farrell's place in the ballet world and the quality of her teaching, the Kennedy Center expanded the program to a national level in 1995, in order to fulfill the Center's mission to enhance the arts education of America's young people. Farrell's students learned to "turn up the technicolor in [their] movement", in order to achieve greater amplification in their dancing. This three weeks' long yearly initiative of intense study grew into a full-fledged program, Exploring Ballet with Suzanne Farrell.

In the fall of 1999, Farrell received critical acclaim for the successful Kennedy Center engagement and East Coast tour of Suzanne Farrell Stages the Masters of 20th-century Ballet. Following the Kennedy Center's debut, the newly named Suzanne Farrell Ballet, a group of professional dancers hand selected by Farrell, has since performed at the Kennedy Center during engagements in 2001 and 2002, been on an extensive East Coast tour, and returned to the Kennedy Center as part of the 2003–2004 Ballet Season following a seven-week national tour. Farrell was selected as one of the five recipients of the 2005 Kennedy Center Honors, one of the highest honors for lifetime artistic achievement.

In 2007, the Suzanne Farrell Ballet formalized the creation of the Balanchine Preservation Initiative. This initiative introduces lost or rarely seen Balanchine works to audiences. As a result, ballets like Ragtime (Balanchine/Stravinsky), Pithoprakta (Balanchine/Xenakis) and Divertimento Brillante (Balanchine/Glinka) were recreated and performed.

Despite positive reviews and an annual budget ranging from $1-$1.4 million, the Center announced in September 2016 that the Company would be disbanding at the end of the 2017 performance season. Deborah Rutter, President of the John F. Kennedy Center for the Performing Arts, noted that the Center would be undergoing a new expansion project to include additional performance and rehearsal space. Farrell's new role in the organization remained unclear, however, Rutter emphasized that Farrell would continue to be an "artistic partner" at the Center.

See also

Women in dance

Further reading and viewing
 Suzanne Farrell, Toni Bentley, Holding on to the Air (Summit Books, New York, 1990)
 Suzanne Farrell: Elusive Muse, 1996 documentary film

References

External links

 The Suzanne Farrell Ballet
 Exploring Ballet with Suzanne Farrell
 Archival footage of Suzanne Farrell speaking about Balanchine and technique in 2006 at Jacob's Pillow Dance Festival
 Archival footage of the Suzanne Farrell Ballet performing Clarinade in 2006 at Jacob's Pillow. 
 Photos of Suzanne Farrell, Getty Images
 The Ballerina Gallery – Suzanne Farrell
 
 Capezio Dance Award – Suzanne Farrell 2005
 2003 BOMB Magazine interview of Suzanne Farrell by Emily Fragos
 

1945 births
Living people
American ballerinas
Balanchine Trust repetiteurs
Prima ballerinas
Ballet mistresses
Florida State University faculty
Artists from Cincinnati
Kennedy Center honorees
University of Cincinnati – College-Conservatory of Music alumni
School of American Ballet alumni
New York City Ballet principal dancers
United States National Medal of Arts recipients
Muses